The fastest times in the swimming events at the Asian Indoor and Martial Arts Games are designated as the AIMAG records in swimming. The events are held in a short course (25 m) pool. All records were set in finals unless noted otherwise.

Men

Women

References

External links

Asian Indoor and Martial Arts Games
Records
Records